Baskeh Masham (also Romanized as Bāskeh Masham; also known as Bāskeh Mastan and Yāskeh Mastan) is a village in Khoshabar Rural District, in the Central District of Rezvanshahr County, Gilan Province, Iran. At the 2006 census, its population was 64, in 14 families.

References 

Populated places in Rezvanshahr County